Mathieu Hubertus Josephus Schoenmaekers (13 December 1875, Maastricht - 18 December 1944, Laren) was a mathematician and theosophist who formulated the plastic and philosophical principles of the De Stijl movement.

Sources
Biography at the Institute for Dutch History (in Dutch)

1875 births
1944 deaths
Dutch Theosophists
De Stijl
People from Maastricht
20th-century Dutch mathematicians